College Settlement of Philadelphia is an American outdoor camp and school located in Horsham, Pennsylvania. Established in 1892, it was originally associated with the settlement movement under the auspices of the College Settlements Association (CSA) to provide educational and social services in South Philadelphia, Pennsylvania, focusing on the mostly immigrant population of the neighborhood it served, and providing a home to the children and young people of the neighborhood.

St. Mary Street
The Philadelphia Settlement was opened April 9, 1892, continuing the work of the St. Mary Street Library Committee. The St. Mary Street neighborhood was well known as one of the worst of the city. Jews, African Americans, Germans, Poles, and a few Italians occupied the tenements in the square bounded by Lombard and South, Sixth and Seventh Streets. The residents of St. Mary's Street lived in the most helpless degradation. Such a neighborhood was not necessarily chosen by the CSA as a desirable one for a settlement. The majority of the population would reject what that settlement had to offer. But for some years, a group of earnest workers known as the St. Mary Street Library Committee had done effective work here, and they strongly felt that the situation was not a hopeless one. Through the influence of the Committee in 1892, the Stuart Memorial Hall, the Starr Garden and other organizations, the College Settlement of Philadelphia was established.

In 1893, a Fellow appointed by the College Settlement Association investigated the food question in the neighborhood and succeeded in getting 25 dietaries as a result of six months' work. In 1896, a Fellow, in conjunction with a Fellow of the University of Pennsylvania, investigated the social and industrial condition of the African Americans of the Seventh Ward.

The years saw an increase of work and workers, which could be traced by looking at the schedules of former years. Lectures, classes, clubs and numerous other activities were a positive force. English classes met on Tuesday and Thursday nights. There was a children's sewing school.

The first summer Kindergarten was established by the city at the College Settlement of Philadelphia. It was so satisfactory that a branch of the James Forten School Kindergarten was permanently placed here, and is still very successful. There are two teachers and an enrolment of eighty-six children. The Settlement furnished assistants and bases its work and acquaintance with the women largely on this Kindergarten.

The settlement, in addition to its work among the people in its immediate vicinity, sought to aim activities of a more public and general character. The first year, various improvements were initiated, notably the repaving of St. Mary Street and other small streets in the vicinity. The question of enlarging the Starr Garden was agitated, the Councilmen of the district approved of the plan brought to their notice by the Settlement committee and other friends of the small parks movement. They reported the matter favorably to the City Councils, and the adjoining property was condemned.

The settlement moved out of the St. Mary Street neighborhood in 1898.

After 1898
By 1897, the address changed to 617 Carver Street.

The CSA's 1904 Annual Report recorded the settlement's location as 433 Christian Street.

The Report included several disappointments. Between 1900 and 1904, the headworker had believed that one of the two graveyards in the vicinity of the Christian Street house was intended as the site of a gymnasium and playground, to be owned and managed by the Settlement until the city government was ready to municipalize such undertakings; however, this did not advance. In addition, no area has been secured for a gymnasium, even though there were only two small yards for out-of-door exercise, sports, and games. No site had been offered for a library building. But there was positive news, too. A new play yard was purchased, transformed, and put freely into use under the management of the Settlement. It was surrounded by a high fence, which made it practicable for girls' gymnastics, as the first yard, No. 429, was not. There was appreciation for the coöperation with other organizations, such as the Needle Work Guild, the Haverford Flower Mission, the Plant Flower and Fruit Guild, the Country Nursery, the Octavia Hill Association, the Society for Organizing Charity, the Alberta Home and other summer outing agencies. In the matter of finances, the year had not been an easy one. It was more difficult to meet an increasing expense account than to secure sporadic donations for special objects.

Notable people
Headworkers at St. Mary Street included: Miss McLain, Dora Freeman, Helena S. Dudley, and Katharine B. Davis. Headworkers at Carver Street included: Myrta Jones and Anna F. Davies.

See also
 Settlement and community houses in the United States

References

External links
 Official website

1892 establishments
South Philadelphia
College Settlements Association
Settlement houses in Pennsylvania
Summer camps in Pennsylvania